This is a list of nicknames or public names of prime ministers of India that were or are in common usage.

Jawaharlal Nehru 
Full name: Jawaharlal Nehru

 Pandit, for his Kashmiri Pandit ancestry.
 Chacha (Hindi: Uncle), as he was better known among children.

Lal Bahadur Shastri
Full name: Lal Bahadur Shastri

 Man of Peace 
 Nanhe (Hindi: Short) was his childhood nickname.

Indira Gandhi 
Full name: Indira Priyadarshini Gandhi

 Priyadarshini (Sanskrit: dear to the sight)
Mother India, a biographical book written on her by Pranay Gupte.
Iron Lady of India, to iterate her gutsy matriarchal charisma.
Durga, a nickname that is rumoured to be given to her by Atal Bihari Vajpayee after she won the Indo-Pakistani War of 1971. Although Vajpayee strongly refused having called her so.

Atal Bihari Vajpayee 
Full name: Atal Bihari Vajpayee

 Ajatashatru (Sanskrit: having no enemy), for having a perpetual good-man aura and no enemies even from the opposing sides.
Bhishma Pitamaha, a nickname that is given to him by former Prime Minister Manmohan Singh.

H. D. Deve Gowda
Full name: Haradanahalli Doddegowda Deve Gowda

 Mannina Maga (Kannada: Son of the Soil), for iterating that he is down-to-earth and cares for the poor.
 Dodda Gowdaru (Kannada: Senior Gowda), for disambiguating him from his children or anybody else with the Gowda title.

Narendra Modi
Full name: Narendra Damodardas Modi

NaMo, a portmanteau derived from his first and last names.
Modiji, a heavily used colloquial term to refer to him.
Chaiwala, (Hindi: Tea-seller) a nickname that was popular among his supporters during 2014 Indian general election.
Chowkidar, (Hindi: watchman) a self-styled nickname that was popular among his supporters during 2019 Indian general elections.

References 

India